The Milotina is a left tributary of the river Vânăta in Romania. It flows into the Vânăta near Fântâna Doamnei.

References

Rivers of Romania
Rivers of Călărași County